Patricia Portillo (born 8 August 1974) is a Spanish freestyle skier. She competed in the women's moguls event at the 1994 Winter Olympics.

References

External links
 

1974 births
Living people
Spanish female freestyle skiers
Olympic freestyle skiers of Spain
Freestyle skiers at the 1994 Winter Olympics
Sportspeople from Madrid